Kim Gwang-seok (born 12 February 1983) is a South Korea football player who since 2007 has played for Incheon United.

Honors

Club
Pohang Steelers
K League 1
Winner : 2007
Runner-up : 2004
KFA Cup
Winner : 2008
Runner-up : 2007
K-League Cup Winner : 2009
AFC Champions League Winner : 2009

Club career statistics

External links 

1983 births
Living people
South Korean footballers
Association football defenders
Pohang Steelers players
K League 1 players